S. typica may refer to:
 Schwartziella typica, a sea snail species
 Sepia typica, a cuttlefish species native to the southwestern Indian Ocean and southeastern Atlantic Ocean
 Similipepsis typica, a moth species known from Cameroon, Equatorial Guinea, Sierra Leone and Zimbabwe

See also
 Typica (disambiguation)